Megan Rae Sweeney (born February 17, 1987 in Portland, Maine) is an American luger who competed from 2007 to 2010.

Career
Her best Luge World Cup season finish was 15th in women's singles in 2007-08.

Sweeney's best finish at the FIL World Luge Championships was 16th in women's singles at Oberhof in 2008. She qualified for the 2010 Winter Olympics where she finished 22nd.

Sweeney announced her retirement from luge on 9 August 2010.

Sweeney is currently pursuing a career in Experiential Marketing and works for On Board Experiential Marketing (www.obexp.com) based in Sausalito, CA. Her younger Sister Emily is still a luger.

References

External links
 

1987 births
American female lugers
Living people
Lugers at the 2010 Winter Olympics
Olympic lugers of the United States
Sportspeople from Portland, Maine